The Colorado National Monument Visitor Center Complex is a group of structures in Colorado National Monument in Mesa County, Colorado, United States, that is listed on the National Register of Historic Places.

Description
The structures are an example of the park services facilities designed and built as part of the Mission 66 program. The complex includes the visitor center, designed by National Park Service architect Cecil J. Doty, the Bookcliff Shelter, designed by NPS architect Phil Romigh, and the Canyon Rim Trail, designed by NPS landscape architects Babbitt Hughes, and built between 1963 and 1965. The structures follow the precedent set by earlier park structures by using native sandstone laid in a random ashlar pattern.

See also

 National Register of Historic Places listings in Mesa County, Colorado

References

External links

Park buildings and structures on the National Register of Historic Places in Colorado
Buildings and structures completed in 1965
Mission 66
National Register of Historic Places in Colorado National Monument
Historic districts on the National Register of Historic Places in Colorado
National Park Service visitor centers